José Andrés Ibáñez (born 20 January 1966) is a Spanish weightlifter. He competed at the 1988 Summer Olympics and the 1992 Summer Olympics.

References

External links
 

1966 births
Living people
Spanish male weightlifters
Olympic weightlifters of Spain
Weightlifters at the 1988 Summer Olympics
Weightlifters at the 1992 Summer Olympics
People from Gandia
Sportspeople from the Province of Valencia
20th-century Spanish people